All Your Favorite Bands is the fourth studio album by American folk-rock band Dawes, released on June 2, 2015.

Critical reception

All Your Favorite Bands currently holds a score of 71 out of 100 at Metacritic based on 12 critic reviews, indicating generally favorable reviews.

Commercial performance
The album debuted at No.1 on the Billboard Folk Albums chart, No. 4 on Top Rock Albums, selling 13,000 copies in its first week.

Track listing
All songs written by Taylor Goldsmith, except where noted.

Personnel
Dawes
Taylor Goldsmith – lead vocals, guitar
Griffin Goldsmith – drums, backing vocals, percussion
Wylie Gelber – bass
Tay Strathairn – keyboards, backing vocals

Additional Musicians
Richard Bennett – acoustic guitar (tracks 1,4,5)
Paul Franklin – steel guitar (tracks 4,7)
David Rawlings – guitar, backing vocals (tracks 2,4)
Gillian Welch – backing vocals (track 5)
Ann McCrary – backing vocals (track 5)
Frieda McCrary – backing vocals (track 5)
Regina McCrary – backing vocals, tambourine (track 5)

Chart performance

Airplay

References

External links
Dawes official website

2015 albums
Dawes (band) albums